Silviu Simioncencu (born December 13, 1975, in Crişan, Tulcea) is a Romanian sprint canoer and three-time world champion in the Canadian canoe events.

He won his first major title at the European championships in 2002, winning the C2 1000m final with Florin Popescu. In 2003 they became world champions at Gainesville, USA. Simioncencu was also a member of Romania's C-4 500 m crew which crossed the line second but was later awarded the gold medal after Russian Sergey Ulegin failed a doping test. A fourth-place finish in the C-4 200 m was also upgraded to bronze for the same reason.

In 2004 Simioncencu also won a C-4 500 m gold medal at the European championships, this time without the aid of disqualifications. At the Athens Olympics Simioncencu and Popescu were unlucky to miss a medal, finishing fourth in both C-2 finals (500 m and 1000 m).

In 2005, despite having changed two crew members, the Romanians retained their European C-4 title and went on to win the World Championship gold medal at Zagreb.

In 2006, Simioncencu won his third consecutive European C-4 500 m title at Račice, Czech Republic. At the World Championships in Szeged, Hungary, however the Romanians had to settle for the bronze medal behind Belarus and Poland. He won another bronze medal in the C-4 1000 m event at the 2009 championships.

Simioncencu is a member of the CSA Steaua Bucharest club. He is 180 cm (5'11) tall and weighs 80 kg (176 lbs).

References
Canoe09.ca profile

External links
 

1975 births
Canoeists at the 2004 Summer Olympics
Living people
Olympic canoeists of Romania
People from Tulcea County
Romanian male canoeists
ICF Canoe Sprint World Championships medalists in Canadian